Phyllosticta manihotis is a plant pathogen originating from the Philippines that forms on the leaves of several cassava species like Manihot dichotoma, M. glaziovii and M. heterophylla.

References

External links
 USDA ARS Fungal Database

Fungal plant pathogens and diseases
Root vegetable diseases
manihotis
Fungi described in 1944